Tribalinae is a subfamily of clown beetles in the family Histeridae. There are about 11 genera and more than 220 described species in Tribalinae.

Genera
These 11 genera belong to the subfamily Tribalinae:
 Caerosternus J. L. LeConte, 1852
 Epierus Erichson, 1834
 Idolia Lewis, 1885
 Parepierus Bickhardt, 1913
 Plagiogramma Tarsia in Curia, 1935
 Pseudepierus Casey, 1916
 Scaphidister Cooman, 1933
 Sphaericosoma Marseul, 1868
 Stictostix Marseul, 1870
 Tribalasia Cooman, 1941
 Tribalus Erichson, 1834

References

Further reading

External links

 

Histeridae
Articles created by Qbugbot